Jun Kumari Roka (Oli) is a Nepalese politician, belonging to the Communist Party of Nepal (Maoist). In the 2008 Constituent Assembly election she was elected from the Rukum-1 constituency by winning 31410 votes, defeating the incumbent Nepali Congress MP Keshar Man Rokka by a wide margin.

References

Living people
Communist Party of Nepal (Maoist Centre) politicians
21st-century Nepalese women politicians
21st-century Nepalese politicians
Nepalese atheists
Year of birth missing (living people)

Members of the 1st Nepalese Constituent Assembly